Ruthenium(III) acetylacetonate is a coordination complex with the formula Ru(O2C5H7)3. O2C5H7− is the ligand called acetylacetonate. This compound exists as a dark violet solid that is soluble in most organic solvents. It is used as a precursor to other compounds of ruthenium.

Preparation
In 1914 tris(acetylacetonato)ruthenium (III) was first prepared by the reaction of ruthenium(III) chloride and acetylacetone in the presence of potassium bicarbonate. Since then, alternative synthetic routes have been examined, but the original procedure remains useful with minor variations:
RuCl3•3H2O + MeCOCH2COMe → Ru(acac)3 + 3 HCl + 3 H2O

Structure and properties
This compound has idealized D3 symmetry. Six oxygen atoms surround the central ruthenium atom in an octahedral arrangement. The average Ru-O bond length in Ru(acac)3 is 2.00 Å. Because Ru(acac)3 is low spin, there is one unpaired d electron, causing this compound to be paramagnetic. Ru(acac)3 has a magnetic susceptibility, χM, of 3.032×10−6 cm3/mol with an effective magnetic moment, μeff, of 1.66 μB.  As a solution in dimethylformamide, the compound oxidizes at 0.593 and reduces at -1.223 V vs the ferrocene/ferrocenium couple.

Reduction of Ru(acac)3 in the presence of alkenes affords the related diolefin complexes. Typically, such reactions are conducted with zinc amalgam in moist tetrahydrofuran: 
2 Ru(acac)3 + 4 alkene + Zn → 2 Ru(acac)2(alkene)2 + Zn(acac)2
The resulting compounds are rare examples of metal-alkene complexes that reversibly sustain oxidation: 
Ru(acac)2(alkene)2  [Ru(acac)2(alkene)2]+  + e−

The complex has been resolved into individual enantiomers by separation of its adduct with dibenzoyltartaric acid.

References

Ruthenium complexes
Acetylacetonate complexes
Ruthenium(III) compounds